Bishop of Cashel can refer to:
Roman Catholic Archdiocese of Cashel and Emly and its predecessors
Bishop of Cashel and Ossory in the Church of Ireland (1977 to date)
Bishop of Cashel and Waterford in the Church of Ireland (1839-1977)

See also:

Archbishop of Cashel